Fort Saint Pierre on Rainy Lake was the first French fort built west of Lake Superior. It was the first of eight forts built during the elder Vérendrye's expansion of trade and exploration westward from the Great Lakes.

History
In 1688 Jacques de Noyon, the first European to reach the area, built a temporary post or camp possibly at the same location. For its position on the fur trade route see Winnipeg River#Exploration and fur trade.

The elder Vérendrye reached Grand Portage in late August 1731. Here most of the men refused to continue because of the late season, difficult portage and largely unknown country. Vérendrye wintered with most of the men at Fort Kaministiquia, but was able to send a few willing men westward under Christopher Dufrost de La Jemeraye. La Jemeraye reached Rainy Lake before the freezeup and built a fort at its outlet. Next May he sent a small load of furs back eastward, Vérendrye arrived in July, and pushed west to Lake of the Woods where he built Fort Saint Charles which quickly overshadowed Fort St. Pierre. Coureurs des bois spread out and drew trade away from the English, but we only know of them from rumors picked up by the English on Hudson Bay. The area produced fish and wild rice. The local people were Monsoni Ojibwe, with Cree further west. Both were at war with the Sioux to the south.  The post remained in operation until 1758. Fort Lac la Pluie was built nearby by the North West Company sometime between 1775 and 1787.  There was a modern reconstruction of the fort, but it was demolished in 2003 due to the deteriorated condition of the building. The site was on the north bank of the Rainy River just past a series of rapids near its outflow from the lake at the modern town of Fort Frances.

La Colle, a Monsoni chief who assisted La Vérendrye a great deal, made his main camp in the vicinity of the fort.  He and his warriors helped control the Sioux of the Prairies in the period when La Vérendrye was leading expeditions and fort building westward.

According to the commemorative plaque by Historic Sites and Monuments of Canada,

Citations

Further reading

External links

 Fort St. Pierre National Historic Site of Canada

Forts in Ontario
1731 establishments in North America
French forts in Canada
National Historic Sites in Ontario
Fort Frances
1731 establishments in the French colonial empire
Military installations established in 1731
Military installations closed in 1758
1758 disestablishments in North America
1758 disestablishments in the French colonial empire